GKT may refer to:

 Gatlinburg–Pigeon Forge Airport, in Tennessee
 Guy's, Kings and St Thomas' Rugby Football Club, based in London
 King's College London GKT School of Medical Education
 Guilty knowledge test, a polygraph technique